Natalya Gorelova, née Zaytseva (born 18 April 1973 in Moscow) is a Russian middle-distance runner who specialized in the 1500 metres.

International competitions

Personal bests
800 metres - 1:57.90 min (1999)
1500 metres - 3:59.70 min (2001)

References

 

1973 births
Living people
Athletes from Moscow
Russian female middle-distance runners
Olympic athletes of Russia
Athletes (track and field) at the 2000 Summer Olympics
World Athletics Championships athletes for Russia
World Athletics Championships medalists
World Athletics Indoor Championships medalists
Russian Athletics Championships winners